Pamela Philipose is an Indian journalist and researcher, who is a senior fellow at the Indian Council of Social Science Research. She was the recipient of the Chameli Devi Jain Award for Outstanding Women Mediapersons in 1999 and has served as an advisor to the Media Task Force of the high level committee of the Government of India. In the 2020 edition of the Ramnath Goenka Excellence in Journalism Awards, she was appointed as one of the jurors along with the likes of B. N. Srikrishna and S. Y. Quraishi.

Career
Philipose was the director and editor-in-chief of the Women's Feature Service and the senior associate editor of The Indian Express. She was also the author of the satirical column Straight Face and the author of a number of commentary pieces of The Indian Express. Since September 2016, Philipose is appointed as the public editor (ombudsman) of The Wire. She has worked as a journalist at The Times of India as well, the paper from where she began her career.

In March 2022 she was amongst 151 international feminists signing Feminist Resistance Against War: A Manifesto, in solidarity with the Feminist Anti-War Resistance initiated by Russian feminists after the Russian invasion of Ukraine.

Bibliography

Academic publications 
 Across the Crossfire: Women and Conflict in India. (eds. 2002; with Bishnoi, Aditi) Kali for Women .  .
 Women's Employment: Work in Progress. (eds. 2013; with Bishnoi, Aditi) Friedrich-Ebert-Stiftung  .
 Media’s Shifting Terrain: Five Years that Transformed the Way India Communicates. (2018) Orient BlackSwan  .

Contributions 

 Ranjan, Nalini, ed. (2005) Practising Journalism: Values, Constraints, Implications. SAGE Publications. .
 Menon, Ritu, ed. (2011). Making a Difference: Memoirs from the Women's Movement in India. Kali for Women. .
 Padgaonkar, Latika; Singh, Shubha, eds. (2012). Making News, Breaking News, Her Own Way. Tranquebar Press. .

Others 

 Laugh All the Way to the Vote Bank. (2002) Penguin Books

References

Living people
Indian women journalists
Indian academics
Year of birth missing (living people)